Jacob K. Norris (born 27 November 1998) is a New Zealand rugby union player who plays for  in the Bunnings NPC competition. His position of choice is flanker. He has played for the Māori All Blacks.

Tasman 
He was part of the Mako side that won the 2019 Mitre 10 Cup. He captained the Mako squad that toured the United States of America in January 2020. In September 2020 he was named in the Tasman Mako squad for the first time. Norris played the first 6 games for the Mako in the 2020 season but then suffered a season ending injury as the Mako went on to win their second premiership title in a row. Norris had a big season as Tasman made the 2021 Bunnings NPC final before losing to  23–20.

Super Rugby 
In July 2020 Norris was called into the  squad during Super Rugby Aotearoa as an injury replacement for Ethan Blackadder.

Māori All Blacks 
In June 2021 Norris was called into the Māori All Blacks squad as injury cover. He made his debut against Samoa at Sky Stadium in Wellington, coming off the bench in a 35-10 win for the side.

References

External links
itsrugby.co.uk profile

New Zealand rugby union players
Living people
Tasman rugby union players
1998 births
Māori All Blacks players
Rugby union flankers
Bay of Plenty rugby union players
Chiefs (rugby union) players